An imperial cult is a form of state religion in which an emperor or a dynasty of emperors (or rulers of another title) are worshipped as demigods or deities. "Cult" here is used to mean "worship", not in the modern pejorative sense. The cult may be one of personality in the case of a newly arisen Euhemerus figure, or one of national identity (e.g., Ancient Egyptian Pharaoh or Empire of Japan) or supranational identity in the case of a multi-ethnic state (e.g., Imperial China, Roman Empire). A divine king is a monarch who is held in a special religious significance by his subjects, and serves as both head of state and a deity or head religious figure. This system of government combines theocracy with an absolute monarchy.

Historical imperial cults

Ancient Egypt

The Ancient Egyptian pharaohs were, throughout ancient Egyptian history, believed to be incarnations of the deity Horus; thereby derived by being the son of Osiris, the afterlife deity, and Isis, goddess of marriage.

The Ptolemaic dynasty based its own legitimacy in the eyes of its Greek subjects on their association with, and incorporation into, the imperial cult of Alexander the Great.

Imperial China

In Imperial China, the Emperor was considered the Son of Heaven. The scion and representative of heaven on earth, he was the ruler of all under heaven, the bearer of the Mandate of Heaven, his commands considered sacred edicts. A number of legendary figures preceding the proper imperial era of China also hold the honorific title of emperor, such as the Yellow Emperor and the Jade Emperor.

Ancient Rome

Even before the rise of the Caesars, there are traces of a "regal spirituality" in Roman society. In earliest Roman times the king was a spiritual and patrician figure and ranked higher than the flamines (priestly order), while later on in history only a shadow of the primordial condition was left with the sacrificial rex sacrorum linked closely to the plebeian orders.

King Numitor corresponds to the regal-sacred principle in early Roman history. Romulus, the legendary founder of Rome, was heroized into Quirinus, the "undefeated god", with whom the later Caesars identified and of whom they considered themselves incarnations.

Varro spoke of the initiatory mystery and power of Roman regality (adytum et initia regis), inaccessible to the exoteric communality.

In Plutarch's Phyrro, 19.5, the Greek ambassador declared amid the Roman Senate he felt instead like being in the midst of "a whole assembly of Kings".

As the Roman Empire developed, the Imperial cult gradually developed more formally and constituted the worship of the Roman emperor as a god. This practice began at the start of the Empire under Augustus, and became a prominent element of Roman religion.

The cult spread over the whole Empire within a few decades, more strongly in the east than in the west. Emperor Diocletian further reinforced it when he demanded the proskynesis and adopted the adjective sacrum for all things pertaining to the imperial person.

The deification of emperors was gradually abandoned after the emperor Constantine I started supporting Christianity. However, the concept of the imperial person as "sacred" carried over, in a Christianized form, into the Byzantine Empire.

Ancient and Imperial Japan

In ancient Japan, it was customary for every clan to claim descendancy from gods (ujigami) and the royal family or clan tended to define their ancestor as the dominant or most important kami of the time.  Later in history, this was considered common practice by noble families, and the head members of the family, including that of the imperial family, were not seen to be divine. Rather than establish sovereignty by the manner of claimed godhood over the nation however, the Emperor and the imperial family stood as the bond between the heavens and the earth by claims of descending from the goddess Amaterasu, instead dealing in affairs related with the gods than any major secular political event, with few cases scattered about history. It was not until the Meiji period and the establishment of the Empire, that the Emperor began to be venerated along with a growing sense of nationalism.

 Arahitogami – the concept of a god who is a human being applied to the Emperor Shōwa (Emperor Hirohito as he was known in the Western World), until the end of World War II.
 Ningen-sengen – the declaration with which the Emperor Shōwa, on New Year's Day 1946, (formally) declined claims of divinity, keeping with traditional family values as expressed in the Shinto religion.

Ancient Southeast Asia
Devaraja is the Hindu-Buddhist cult of deified royalty in Southeast Asia. It is simply described as Southeast Asian concept of divine king. The concept viewed the monarch (king) as the living god, the incarnation of the supreme god, often attributed to Shiva or Vishnu, on earth. The concept is closely related to Indian concept of Chakravartin (universal monarch). In politics, it is viewed as the divine justification of a king's rule. The concept gained its elaborate manifestations in ancient Java and Cambodia, where monuments such as Prambanan and Angkor Wat were erected to celebrate the king's divine rule on earth.

In the Mataram kingdom, it was customary to erect a candi (temple) to honor the soul of a deceased king. The image inside the garbhagriha (inner sanctum) of the temple often portrayed the king as a god, since the soul was thought to be united with the god referred to, in svargaloka. It is suggested that the cult was the fusion of Hinduism with native Austronesian ancestor worship. In Java, the tradition of the divine king extended to the Kediri, Singhasari and Majapahit kingdoms in the 15th century. The tradition of public reverence to the King of Cambodia and King of Thailand is the continuation of this ancient devaraja cult. The Susuhunan of Surakarta and Sultan of Yogyakarta  are the direct descendants of the Mataram Sultanate founded in the late 17th century, and was said to be the continuation of the Ancient 8th century Mataram kingdom.

Examples of divine kings in history

Some examples of historic leaders who are often considered divine kings are:

 Africa
 Pharaohs of Ancient Egypt
 Shilluk Kingdom was ruled by a divine monarchy 
 Ghanas (Kings) of the Empire of Ghana
 Asia
 God Worshipping Society leader Hong Xiuquan, leader of the Taiping Rebellion, claimed to be Christ's younger brother, and attempted to establish rule as a divine king
 Korean Buddhist monk Gung-ye, King of Taebong
 The Japanese emperors up to the end of World War II
 Javanese Kings during Hindu-Buddhist era (4th century – 15th century AD) such as Sailendra dynasty, Kediri, Singhasari and Majapahit empire
 Kings of Khmer Empire, Cambodia
 Srivijaya emperors
 Americas
 Kings of the Maya city-states of the Classical period
 Sapa Incas in pre-Hispanic South America; considered descendants of the sun god Inti.
 Oceania
 Kings or Akua Alii of the Hawaiian Islands before 1839
 Europe
 Many Roman emperors were declared gods by the Roman Senate (generally after their death; see Roman imperial cult).

See also

Notes

References

Further reading
 
 
 
 
 

Religious nationalism
Theocracy
Worship